Alessio Boni (born 4 July 1966) is an Italian actor.

Life
Boni was born in Sarnico in 1966. He studied theatre at the Accademia Nazionale d'Arte Drammatica. The second of three children, Marco is the eldest and Andrea is the youngest brother. In 1998, he had his television breakthrough in La Donna del Treno.

Other roles:
 Quincy Moritz in Dracula (2002)
 Matteo Carati in The Best of Youth (La meglio gioventù) (2003)
 The Beast in the Heart (La bestia nel cuore / Don't Tell) (2005)
 Once You're Born You Can No Longer Hide (2005)
 The Goodbye Kiss (2006)
 Andrey Nikolayevich Bolkonsky in War and Peace (2007 - RAI-television series)
 Caravaggio in  Caravaggio  (2007 - RAI-television series)
 Giacomo Puccini in  Puccini (2008 - RAI-television series)
 Sgt. Cerato in The Tourist (2010)
 Somewhere Amazing (2015)
 The Girl in the Fog (2017)
 Fra Dolcino in The Name of the Rose (2019)

External links
Website

References

1966 births
Accademia Nazionale di Arte Drammatica Silvio D'Amico alumni
Italian male film actors
Living people
Nastro d'Argento winners